Viscount of Dundee was a title in the Peerage of Scotland. It was created on 12 November 1688 for John Graham with remainder to him and his heirs male of his body, which failing, to his other heirs male. He was made Lord Graham of Claverhouse at the same time, also in the Peerage of Scotland. The second Viscount died an infant in 1689. The title was forfeited by the third Viscount in 1690, but continued to be used by the heirs-male, also Jacobites, into the next century.

Viscounts of Dundee (1688)
John Graham, 1st Viscount of Dundee (d. 1689)
James Graham, 2nd Viscount of Dundee (d. 1689), son of the preceding
David Graham, 3rd Viscount of Dundee (d. 1700), uncle of the preceding
Heirs but for the attainder:
David Graham of Duntroon (d. 1706), did not use the title
William Graham, titular 5th Viscount (d. 1717), attainted for his part in the 'Fifteen
James Graham, titular 6th Viscount (d. 1759), took part in the 'Forty-Five

References

People associated with Dundee
Noble titles created in 1688
Forfeited viscountcies in the Peerage of Scotland
1688 establishments in Scotland
Peerages created with special remainders